This is a list of television programs currently broadcast (in first-run or reruns), scheduled to be broadcast or formerly broadcast on Univision, a Spanish-language American broadcast television network.

Current programming

Original programming

Acquired programming

Upcoming programming

Former programming

Original programming

Telenovelas

Television series

News / public affairs programming

Talk / reality shows

Music/variety shows

Comedy programming

Game shows

Sports programming

Acquired programming

Telenovelas 

A que no me dejas
Abismo de pasión
Acorralada 
Agujetas de color de rosa 
Al diablo con los guapos
Alborada
Alegrijes y Rebujos 
Alma Rebelde 
Alondra 
Amada Enemiga 
Amar otra vez
Amar sin límites
Amarte es mi Pecado
Amigas y Rivales 
Amor bravío
Amor Comprado
Amor de barrio
Amor dividido
Amor eterno
Amor Gitano
Amor Real
Amor sin maquillaje 
Amorcito Corazón  
Amores con trampa
Amores verdaderos
Amy, la niña de la mochila azul 
Ángel Rebelde
Ángela 
Antes muerta que Lichita
Apuesta por un amor
Atrévete a Soñar
Aventuras en el tiempo
Bajo las riendas del amor 
Bajo la misma piel 
Bajo Un Mismo Rostro 
Barrera de amor 
Bendita mentira 
Besos Robados 
Cachito de cielo
Caer en tentación
Camaleones 
Camila 
Cañaveral de Pasiones 
Canción de amor 
Carita de Ángel
Carita Pintada 
Central de Abasto
Cita a ciegas
Clap, el lugar de tus sueños
Clase 406
Código Postal
Como tú no hay 2
Cómplices Al Rescate
Confidente de secundaria 
Contigo sí
Contra viento y marea
Corazón Apasionado
Corazón Indomable
Corazón que miente
Corazón salvaje (1993)
Corazón Salvaje (2009)
Corazones al limite 
Corona de Lágrimas
Cosita Linda 
Cuando me enamoro 
Cuento de Navidad  
Cuidado con el angel
De Que Te Quiero, Te Quiero 
Despertar contigo
Destilando amor 
El Diario de Daniela 
Diseñando tu amor
DKDA, Sueños de Juventud 
Doña Flor y sus dos maridos
Dos Hogares 
Duelo de Pasiones
Dulce ambición
El alma no tiene color 
El amor no tiene precio 
El color de la pasión
El hotel de los secretos
El juego de la vida 
El Manantial 
El niño que vino del mar
El Noveno mandamiento
El Privilegio de Amar
El premio mayor
El Rico y Lázaro
El vuelo de la victoria
En nombre del amor
En tierras salvajes
Enamorada
Enamorándome de Ramón 
Entre el amor y el odio
Esperanza del Corazón  
Fuego en la sangre 
Gotita de amor 
Hasta el fin del mundo
Hasta que el dinero nos separe
Heridas de Amor
Hijas de la luna
Huracán 
Imperio de mentiras
Inocente de Ti
Jesús
Juro Que Te Amo
La desalmada
La doble vida de Estela Carrillo
La Dueña 
La esposa virgen
La fea más bella 
La fuerza del destino
La Gata
La herencia
La hija del embajador
La Intrusa 
La madrastra (2005 TV series)
La madrastra (2022 TV series)
La Malquerida
La mexicana y el güero
La mujer de mi vida 
La mujer del Vendaval 
La Otra
La Pícara Soñadora 
La que no podía amar 
La reina soy yo
La sombra del otro 
La sombra del pasado
La Tierra Prometida
La Tempestad
La usurpadora
La vecina
La verdad oculta
Las amazonas
Las dos caras de Ana
Las tontas no van al cielo 
Las vías del amor
Like
Llena de amor
Llovizna 
Locura de amor
Lo imperdonable 
Lo Que La Vida Me Robó
Lola...Érase una vez 
Los ricos también lloran
Luz Clarita
Madre
Mañana Es Para Siempre
Mar de amor 
María Belén 
María Isabel 
María José
María la del Barrio 
Maria Mercedes 
Mariana de la Noche 
Marido y Mujer 
Marimar 
Marisol
Me declaro culpable
Médicos
Mentir para vivir
Mi adorable maldición
Mi corazón es tuyo
Mi Destino Eres Tú
Mi fortuna es amarte
Mi marido tiene familia
Mi pecado
Mi pequeña traviesa
Miss XV
Mi vida eres tú
Muchacha italiana viene a casarse
Muchachitas como tú
Mujer bonita 
Mujer de madera
Mujer de nadie
Mujeres engañadas 
Mundo de Fieras
Navidad sin fin 
Necesito una amiga 
Ni contigo ni sin ti  
Niña Amada Mía
Niña de mi Corazón
No me hallo
Nunca te dire Adios
Nunca Te Olvidaré
Olvidarte Jamás 
Palabra de Mujer
Papá a toda madre
Para Volver a amar 
Pasión y poder
Pecadora
Peregrina 
Piel de otoño 
Pobre Millonaria
Por amar sin ley
Por ella soy Eva 
Por siempre Joan Sebastián
Por Siempre mi Amor
Por tu amor
Porque el Amor Manda
Preciosa 
Primer amor, a mil por hora 
Prisionera de amor
Qué bonito amor 
¿Qué le pasa a mi familia?
Qué pobres tan ricos
Que te perdone Dios
Quererlo todo
Querida Enemiga
Quiero Amarte
Rafaela 
Ramona
Rayito de luz 
Rebelde 
Rencor apasionado
Ringo
Rosalinda
Rosario Tijeras
Rubí 
Sabor a tí 
Sacrificio de Mujer 
Salomé 
Samantha 
Sentimientos Ajenos 
Ser Bonita No Basta 
Serafín
Simplemente María
Si nos dejan
Sin ti
Sin tu mirada
 Soltero con hijas
Somos tú y yo 
Soñadoras 
Soñar no Cuesta Nada 
Sortilegio 
 S.O.S me estoy enamorando
Soy tu dueña 
Sueño de amor (2016)
Te acuerdas de mí 
Te doy la vida
Te sigo amando
Tenías que ser tú
Teresa (1989)
Teresa (2010) 
Tormenta en el Paraiso 
Tres veces Ana
Triunfo del amor
Trópic 
Tú y yo
Un gancho al corazón
Una familia con suerte
Una luz en el camino
Un camino hacia el destino
Un Refugio Para El Amor
Valeria 
Velo de Novia
Vencer el desamor
Vencer el miedo
 Vencer el pasado
 Vencer la ausencia
Verano de Amor
Vino el amor 
¡Vivan los Niños! 
Vivo por Elena
Y mañana será otro día
Yo amo a Juan Querendon
Yo no creo en los hombres
Zacatillo, un lugar en tu corazón

Television series

News / public affairs programming

Comedy programming

Talk / reality shows

Children's programming

Game shows

Music / variety shows

Notes

References

Univision